Wild Hearts is a 2006 American made-for-television drama film starring Emmy Award winning actor Richard Thomas, Hallee Hirsh and Nancy McKeon. The film premiered on Hallmark Channel on July 8, 2006.

Plot summary
A widowed Los Angeles police detective inherits his family mustang ranch in Montana and returns with his reluctant daughter. He takes a job as sheriff and soon must contend with a series of events that cause him to come to terms with his past.

Cast
 Richard Thomas as Bob Hart
 Hallee Hirsh as Madison
 Nancy McKeon as Emily 
 Geoffrey Lewis as Hank
 A. J. Trauth as Tim

References

External links

2006 television films
2006 films
American drama television films
Hallmark Channel original films
Films set in Montana
Films directed by Steve Boyum
2006 drama films
2000s American films
2000s English-language films